Gods River is a remote, isolated settlement in Northern Manitoba, Canada, and the primary settlement of the Manto Sipi Cree Nation First Nations community. The settlement is on Gods Lake at the point of outflow of the Gods River.

The community can only be reached by winter road or by air via Gods Lake Airport.

The official languages of the community are English and Cree.  There is a lodge for tourists to stay for visits to the community. Population is approximately 400-700 community members as of 2021.

References

External links
 Map of God's River 86A at Statcan

Keewatin Tribal Council
Indian reserves in Northern Region, Manitoba
Unincorporated communities in Northern Region, Manitoba